The 2007 Mirage Cup was an ITF and USTA tennis tournament held in Las Vegas, Nevada, in the United States. The singles title was won by Caroline Wozniacki, and the doubles went to Victoria Azarenka and Tatiana Poutchek. The 2007 Tennis Channel Open was the men's version of the 2007 Mirage Cup, and was part of the 2007 ATP Tour. The tournament was worth $75,000 in prizes.

Champions

Women's singles

 Caroline Wozniacki defeated  Akiko Morigami 6–3, 6–2

Women's doubles

 Victoria Azarenka /  Tatiana Poutchek defeated  Maret Ani /  Alberta Brianti 6–2, 6–4

External links
Main Draws
Qualifying Draws

Mirage Cup, 2007
Mirage Cup